German submarine U-441 was a Type VIIC U-boat of Nazi Germany's Kriegsmarine during World War II, which served for a short time as an anti-aircraft submarine under the designation U-flak 1.

The submarine was laid down on 15 October 1940 at the Schichau-Werke in Danzig as yard number 1492, launched on 13 December 1941 and commissioned on 21 February 1942, under the command of Kapitänleutnant Klaus Hartmann.

U-441 first served with the 5th U-boat Flotilla, a training unit, and then operationally with the 1st flotilla from 1 October 1942. She was lost on 30 June 1944.

Design
German Type VIIC submarines were preceded by the shorter Type VIIB submarines. U-441 had a displacement of  when at the surface and  while submerged. She had two shafts and two  propellers.

U-441 was fitted with five  torpedo tubes (four fitted at the bow and one at the stern), fourteen torpedoes, one  SK C/35 naval gun, 220 rounds, and an anti-aircraft gun. The boat had a complement of between forty-four and sixty.

Service history

First and second patrols
Her first patrol took her from Kiel, Germany to Brest in occupied France, via Trondheim in Norway and the mid-Atlantic, between 17 September and 7 November 1942, spending 38 days at sea.

Her second patrol, sailing from Brest (where she was based for the rest of her career), on 7 December 1942, again took her out into the mid-Atlantic where on 27 December she sank the Dutch 7,051 GRT cargo ship Soekaboemi, part of Convoy ON 154. The ship had been wrecked and abandoned after being struck by a torpedo from  hours before. The U-boat returned to Brest on 22 January 1943.

Third patrol, conversion and fourth patrol
U-441 departed on 27 February 1943 for another Atlantic patrol, but had no success. On 20 March the boat was attacked by a Sunderland aircraft west of Ireland and slightly damaged. She returned to Brest on 11 April after 44 days at sea.

In April–May 1943, in recognition of the air threat, U-441 was converted into the first of four U-flak boats, which were designed to be surface escorts for attack U-boats operating from the French Atlantic bases and intended to lure unsuspecting aircraft into a deadly trap. The U-flak boats had greatly increased anti-aircraft firepower, U-441 was fitted with additional gun platforms forward and aft of the conning tower, which served as a base for two four-barrelled Flakvierling 20 mm flak guns and one  Flak M42 weapon, as well as a number of MG 42 machine guns. U-441 was re-designated U-flak 1. The increased anti-aircraft capability required additional personnel, so crew numbers were increased from 44 to 48 men to 67.

As Kptlt. Klaus Hartmann was seriously ill, U-flak 1 sailed from Brest on 22 May 1943 under the command of Kptlt. It was not long before the new configuration was put to the test. At 20:50 on the 24th, the flak boat was attacked by a Sunderland of 228 squadron RAF in the Bay of Biscay. Despite being hit by heavy anti-aircraft fire, the aircraft managed to drop five depth charges before it crashed into the sea; the attack wounded one crewman and extensively damaged U-Flak 1 which returned to base the next day.

Fifth patrol
Her second patrol as a U-flak boat began on 8 July 1943. On the 12th the boat was strafed by three Beaufighter aircraft from No. 248 Squadron RAF. Ten men were killed and thirteen others wounded, including all of the officers. Marine-Stabsarzt Dr. Paul Pfaffinger, an experienced U-boat doctor took command, and brought the boat safely back to Brest, subsequently being awarded the German Cross in Gold. By this time the U-flak boats were considered a failure and U-flak 1 was converted back to her original configuration and reverted to U-441.

Sixth, seventh and eighth patrols
With Kptlt. Klaus Hartmann returning to command the U-441, she made three unsuccessful patrols between October 1943 and May 1944. The only incident of note was when she was unsuccessfully attacked by an unknown aircraft on 2 March 1944.

Ninth patrol and sinking
U-441 sailed from Brest for the final time on 6 June 1944, ("D-Day"), and headed into the English Channel. The submarine did not establish radio contact after 8 June and was lost with all hands thereafter, but her fate is not sure. Probably she was one two U-boats sunk on 8 June by depth charges dropped from a Liberator of 224 Squadron RAF, piloted by Kenneth Owen Moore. Earlier publications connected sinking U-441 with Polish Wellington Mk XIV from 304 Squadron, piloted by Leopold Antoniewicz, which was credited with sinking a submarine on 18 June in the approximate position .

Wolfpacks
U-441 took part in 13 wolfpacks, namely:
 Panther (10 – 16 October 1942) 
 Puma (16 – 29 October 1942) 
 Spitz (22 – 28 December 1942) 
 Falke (28 December 1942 – 14 January 1943) 
 Neuland (6 – 13 March 1943) 
 Dränger (14 – 20 March 1943) 
 Seewolf (21 – 28 March 1943) 
 Schill (25 – 31 October 1943) 
 Hinein (26 January – 3 February 1944) 
 Igel 1 (3 – 17 February 1944) 
 Hai 1 (17 – 22 February 1944) 
 Preussen (22 February – 1 March 1944) 
 Dragoner (21 – 28 May 1944)

Summary of raiding history

References

Bibliography

External links

German Type VIIC submarines
U-boats commissioned in 1942
U-boats sunk in 1944
U-boats sunk by depth charges
U-boats sunk by British aircraft
World War II submarines of Germany
World War II shipwrecks in the English Channel
1941 ships
Ships built in Danzig
Ships built by Schichau
Ships lost with all hands
Maritime incidents in June 1944